Buriti do Tocantins is a municipality located in the Brazilian state of Tocantins. Its population was 11,497 (2020) and its area is 252 km².

References

Municipalities in Tocantins